Ruben Laudelino Bareño Silva (born 23 January 1944) is a Uruguayan football forward who played for Uruguay in the 1970 FIFA World Cup. He also played for C.A. Cerro. In Argentina, he was played in Racing.

References

External links
 FIFA profile

1944 births
Living people
Uruguayan footballers
Uruguay international footballers
Association football forwards
Uruguayan Primera División players
Argentine Primera División players
C.A. Cerro players
Racing Club de Avellaneda footballers
1970 FIFA World Cup players
Uruguayan expatriate footballers
Expatriate footballers in Argentina